Chengamanad may refer to:
 Chengamanad, Ernakulam district, Kerala, India. 
 Chengamanadu, Kollam district, Kerala, India.